Eindhoven Airport  is an airport located  west of Eindhoven, Netherlands. In terms of the number of served passengers, it is the second largest airport in the Netherlands, with 6.2 million passengers in 2018 (well behind Schiphol, which served more than 70 million passengers). The airport is used by both civilian and military traffic.

History

Early years
The airport was founded in 1932 as a grass strip under the name Vliegveld Welschap (Welschap Airfield). In 1939 the airfield was acquired for use by the Air Force, as concerns over a military conflict with Germany increased. The airfield was quickly captured by German forces during the Battle of the Netherlands and re-used by them under the name Fliegerhorst Eindhoven. The airfield was expanded and improved by the Germans, with three paved runways and numerous hangars and support buildings being constructed.

The airfield was captured by American paratroopers during Operation Market Garden. Damage to the airfield was repaired and the airfield was re-used as an Advanced Landing Ground by both US and British forces under the designation B-78.

The airfield was returned to the Royal Netherlands Air Force in 1952. It was home to crews flying the Republic F-84G Thunderjet, Republic F-84F Thunderstreak, Northrop NF-5A/B, and finally the General Dynamics F-16A/B Fighting Falcon. 316 Squadron flew the F-16 and was inactivated in April 1994.

Development since the 1980s
In 1984, a terminal building for civilian air traffic was constructed, based on a Leo de Bever design. After the end of the Cold War, Eindhoven was transformed into a military transport base. Initially it was home to F27-300M Troopship aircraft. Over the years, Fokker 50, Fokker 60, McDonnell Douglas KDC-10, Lockheed C-130 Hercules and Gulfstream IV aircraft were stationed at the air base. The Fokker aircraft have been retired.

On 15 July 1996, a Belgian Air Force C-130H Hercules crashed at the airport – known as the Herculesramp (Hercules disaster). The plane caught fire and 34 people died in the intense heat. Communication problems within the emergency services meant that fire services were not aware that the C-130 carried many passengers, which likely caused more deaths.

On the civilian side, the airport has continued to grow and is now the second-largest airport in the Netherlands. To accommodate this, in early 2012 work to expand Eindhoven airport was started including the addition of a 120-room Tulip Inn Hotel.

On 27 May 2017, a parking garage collapsed during construction. The cause of the collapse was determined to be a construction error; the floors were made of prefabricated concrete slabs, and the connection between the slabs did not meet safety requirements. The reduced strength of the construction, in combination with the heat on that day, resulted in the partial collapse of the building. Nobody was injured or killed.

In October 2018, Ryanair announced it would be closing its base at the airport on 5 November 2018. Construction of a 4 star hotel by Holiday Inn was started in 2018; the hotel opened in 2019.

Facilities
Passenger facilities include: exchange office, lost property office, luggage lockers, baby changing area, health centre, and various shops such as Rituals, AH to GO, Victoria's Secret, and tax free shops: Travel Plaza and Travel luxury; and also a new Business Lounge: Aspire by Swissport
Eindhoven Airport also has a variety of restaurants, bars and cafes, such as: Upstairs (the Tulip Inn Hotel bar), La Place, The Bar (a flagship of Bavaria beer) and Starbucks (both before and after the security check).

The airport also has a business centre. There are 1,500 parking spaces for long and short term parking.

Military

 334 Squadron with Airbus A330-MRTT & Gulfstream IV
 336 Squadron with Lockheed C-130
 940 Maintenance Support Squadron
 941 Miscellaneous Support Squadron
 Movement Coordination Centre Europe
 European Air Transport Command

From 1 July 2007, Eindhoven has been the location of the Movement Coordination Centre Europe (MCCE), a merger of the former European Airlift Centre (EAC), established by the European Air Group, and the Sea-lift Coordination Centre (SCC). MCCE is a non-NATO/non-European military organization. MCCE is an organization open to all governments whose membership is accepted by all the other participant nations, regulated by a specific legal technical agreement. The mission of the MCCE is to coordinate the use of air transport, surface transport (sea and land) and air-to-air refuelling (AAR) capabilities between participating nations, and thereby improve the overall efficiency of the use of owned or leased assets of the national military organizations. The centre's main focus will be on strategic movements, but not exclude operational and tactical movements.

Since September 2010, Eindhoven Airport has hosted the European Air Transport Command, made up of seven European nations which share aerial military assets in a single operative command. EATC will play a leading role in the A400M standardization process.

Airlines and destinations

The following airlines operate regular scheduled and charter flights to and from Eindhoven:

Statistics

Ground transport
Eindhoven Airport is located just off the A2 motorway which offers direct connections to the North west, centre and south of the country, including the cities of Amsterdam, Utrecht and Maastricht. The airport is also served by two of Eindhoven's electric bus routes.
 Line 400 is a shuttle bus service line that connects the airport to its main railway station.
 Line 401 is a bus rapid transit line that connects the airport to Eindhoven's city centre and its main railway station.
 Line 20 connects Best railway station and the town of Best with Eindhoven Airport. Also connects the airport with the town of Veldhoven and the High Tech Campus of Eindhoven.
 Line 10 connects the Eindhoven railway station, the district of Strijp-T (connecting with the Eindhoven Strijp-S railway station), and the Nieuw Acht Industrial Complex with Eindhoven Airport.

See also
 Transport in the Netherlands
 List of airports in the Netherlands

References

External links

 
 
 

Royal Netherlands Air Force bases
Airports in North Brabant
Airports established in 1932
Buildings and structures in Eindhoven
Transport in Eindhoven
1932 establishments in the Netherlands
International airports in the Netherlands
20th-century architecture in the Netherlands